Investment Corporation of Dubai is a sovereign wealth fund of the Government of Dubai established in 2006, with a mandate to invest funds on behalf of the Government of Dubai, and manage their portfolio of investment companies.

At 2022, ICD reported assets worth US$305 billion and revenue of $62 billion.

History 
ICD was set up on 3 May 2006 under Emiri decree 11 of 2006 issued by Mohammed bin Rashid Al Maktoum, Vice President and Prime Minister of the United Arab Emirates (UAE), and ruler of the Emirate of Dubai.

In 2007, the Government of Dubai transferred the majority stake in Emirates Bank International (EBI), National Bank of Dubai (NBD), Dubai World Trade Center, Emirates National Oil Company, Emirates Global Aluminium, Borse Dubai, Emirates Airlines, dnata and CBME to Investment Corporation of Dubai. In the same year, the merger of EBI and NBD took place and Emirates National Bank of Dubai (ENBD) was formed with a market capitalization of more than $11.3 Billion. The Government of Dubai transferred Dubai financial Market and Dubai International Financial Exchange to Borse Dubai which acquired interest in London Stock Exchange and Nasdaq OMX. Minority stakes of Emmar Properties, Dubai Islamic Bank, Commercial Bank of Dubai, Dubai Ice Plant & Cold Stores Company, and Dubai Development Company were transferred to ICD by the Government of Dubai.

In 2009, the Dubai Government transferred Dubai Duty Free, Dubai Silicon Oasis Authority, Dubai Airport Free Zone Authority, Emaratech, and Aswaaq to ICD. National Bond Corporation becomes a subsidiary of ICD in the year 2010. In 2012 ICD acquired Smartstreams Technologies group limited and controlling stake in Dubai Aerospace Enterprise (DAE).

In 2015, ICD acquired a controlling stake in South Korean construction firm Ssangyong Engineering and Construction, Mandarin Oriental New York, and Washington DC hotel. In 2016 ICD acquired Porto Montenegro Marina and Resort located in world heritage site Bay of Kotro from Montport Capital. In 2017 ALEC engineering and Contracting Limited was acquired by ICD and ISS Global Forwarding in 2018. In 2019 DAE became a wholly owned subsidiary of ICD.

Various other mergers and acquisitions were also held by other holding companies of ICD between the periods of 2007 - 2019.

In October 2017 ICD listed a $200 million Sukuk on NASDAQ Dubai. This was its second conventional bond listing on Nasdaq Dubai, after a $300 million bond was listed in 2014. In addition, ICD has two Sukuk, also commonly referred to as sharia compliant bonds, on Nasdaq Dubai, one worth $1 billion listed in 2017 and another worth $700 million listed in May 2014.

In November 2019 ICD inked a deal with India-based Reliance to buy its stake in Reliance Nippon Life Asset Management Ltd.

Governance 
The Crown Prince of Dubai and Chairman of Dubai Executive council Sheikh Hamdan bin Mohammed bin Rashid al Maktoum is Chairman of ICD. Other position holders include board members.

 Maktoum bin Mohammed bin Rashid Al Maktoum (Deputy Ruler of Dubai, vice-chairman)
 Ahmed bin Saeed Al Maktoum (board member)
 Mohammed Ibrahim Al Shaibani (board member and managing director)
 Reem bint Ebrahim Al Hashimy (board member)
 Sultan bin Saeed Al Mansouri (board member)
 Abdulrahman Saleh Al Saleh (board member)
 Mohamed Hadi Al Hussaini (board member)
 Helal Saeed Al Marri (board member)

Portfolio 
ICD's portfolio primarily includes businesses and assets either wholly or partially owned by the Dubai Government.

References

External links 

 
 Investment Corporation of Dubai on CB Insights

Economy of the United Arab Emirates
Sovereign wealth funds
Government agencies established in 2006
Emirati companies established in 2006
Financial services companies established in 2006
Government-owned companies of the United Arab Emirates